This is a list of Israel's ambassadors to Kazakhstan.  The current ambassador is Liat Wexelman, who has held the position since 2018.

List of Ambassadors

 Edwin Nathan Yabo Glusman 2022 - 
Liat Wexelman 2018 - 2022
Michael Brodsky 2015 - 2018
Eliyaho Tasman 2012 - 2015
Israel Mey Ami 2008 - 2012
Ran Ichay 2006 - 2008
Michael Lotem 2004 - 2006
Moshe Kimhi 2002 - 2004
Israel Mey Ami 1996 - 2002
Ambassador Bentsion Karmel 1993 - 1996
Chargé d'Affaires a.i. Arkady Milman 1992 - 1993

References

Kazakhstan
Israel